SS John Ringling was a Liberty ship built in the United States during World War II. She was named after John Ringling, an American entrepreneur who is the best known of the seven Ringling brothers, five of whom merged the Barnum & Bailey Circus with their own Ringling Bros World's Greatest Shows. In addition to owning and managing many of the largest circuses in the United States, he was also a rancher, a real estate developer and art collector.

Construction
John Ringling was laid down on 1 August 1944, under a Maritime Commission (MARCOM) contract, MC hull 2494, by the St. Johns River Shipbuilding Company, Jacksonville, Florida; she was sponsored by Ida Loraina Wihelmina North, the sister of the namesake, and was launched on 10 September 1944.

History
She was allocated to the Luckenbach Steamship Co., Ltd., on 23 September 1944. On 3 September 1948, she was laid up in the National Defense Reserve Fleet, Beaumont, Texas. She was sold for scrapping, 22 February 1972, to Andy Equipment, Inc., for $39,333. She was removed from the fleet, 16 March 1972.

References

Bibliography

 
 
 
 

 

Liberty ships
Ships built in Jacksonville, Florida
1944 ships
Beaumont Reserve Fleet